Linda Francis Duncan (born June 25, 1949) is a Canadian lawyer and former politician who served as the member of Parliament (MP) for the riding of Edmonton—Strathcona from 2008 to 2015. A member of the New Democratic Party (NDP), Duncan was the only non-Conservative MP from Alberta from 2008 to 2015.

Before politics, Duncan founded and ran the Environmental law Center and practiced as an environmental lawyer, working in Edmonton until 1987 when she moved to Ottawa to work for Environment Canada. She then taught environmental law at Dalhousie Law School (now the Schulich School of Law) and advised the Government of Indonesia on environmental assessment and enforcement. She also spent time in Whitehorse working as an assistant deputy in the Yukon government, later consulting with Kluane First Nation and later in Montreal as Head Law and Enforcement for the NAFTA's Commission for Environmental Cooperation. Duncan also served on the Sierra Legal Defence Fund (now Ecojustice Canada) Board of Directors.

Early life and career 
Linda Duncan was born in Edmonton on June 25, 1949. Her father, Darcy Duncan, a second-generation lawyer, supported the family which included a brother, a younger sister and an older sister, along with their mother. She grew up in the south side of Edmonton. She attended the University of Alberta, graduating from their law school. With an interest in environmental law she passed upon the opportunity to join a law firm and founded the Environmental Law Centre in 1982 to assist Albertans concerned with environmental and natural resources law.

In 1987, Duncan was recruited by the federal Minister of Environment to establish a new enforcement unit at Environment Canada. After a year in Ottawa, she move onto Whitehorse where she worked as the assistant deputy Minister for Renewable Resources in the Yukon government. She moved to Montreal after she accepted a position helping lead the enforcement department of NAFTA's Commission for Environmental Cooperation. Through projects by the World Bank and the Asian Development Bank she helped establish environmental law enforcement systems in Jamaica, Indonesia, and Bangladesh. During this time, in the 1990s, she earned a Master of Laws from Dalhousie Law School and taught several courses. Following the death of her father and two sisters she moved back to Edmonton in 1999.

On the local level, in addition to her work at the Environmental Law Centre in Edmonton, she worked on projects with the Edmonton Social Planning Council, Alberta's Clean Air Strategic Alliance, and the Canadian Council on Human Resources for the Environment Industry. She served on the Board of Directors the Sierra Legal Defence Fund from 2001 to 2007. Her family has had a cottage at Wabamun Lake since her youth and she has participated on the Lake Wabamun Enhancement and Protection Association. Acting as their vice-president during the August 2005 CN Rail oil spill she was interviewed in the media on behalf of the land owners and lake users. With the association and the Sierra Legal Defence Fund she helped make a submission to the United Nations Environment Programme noting Canada was not enforcing the legally-binding Heavy Metals Protocol, making specific reference to high levels of mercury being released from coal-fired power plants.

Political career 
For the 39th Canadian federal election, in January 2006, Duncan ran as the New Democratic Party candidate for the riding of Edmonton-Strathcona. The contest was expected to be close so in the final days of the campaign the party shifted resources there and the party leader, Jack Layton, traveled the riding, his second visit during the campaign. Nevertheless, incumbent Conservative MP Rahim Jaffer won the riding over Duncan by almost 5,000 votes.

2008 election as MP

On January 19, 2007, Duncan accepted the NDP nomination in Edmonton—Strathcona, by acclamation, to again seek election to Parliament in the 40th Canadian federal election. The election campaign began in September 2008. To make environmental protection an election issue, Duncan and Jack Layton flew over the oil sands area noting environmental impact. Duncan made support for public  health care, enforcement of environmental laws, and driving the economy with 'green jobs' priorities in her campaign. She drew upon support from a large volunteer network built since the last election and strategic voting from Liberal supporters. With the polls showing a close race, Jaffer launched an attack ad against Duncan.

On election night, October 14, the results showed Jaffer as the leader, by 1,000 votes with over half the polls reporting. Jaffer delivered his victory speech around 10 p.m. and several people had projected Jaffer had been reelected. However, late polls, which included residences around the University of Alberta, put Duncan ahead. Following a few days of silence and after his fiancée, fellow Conservative Member of Parliament Helena Guergis, flew to Edmonton and quietly married him, Jaffer conceded defeat to Duncan. With a 463-vote margin, Duncan became the only non-Conservative MP in Alberta, and the first NDP member from the province since 1988.

During the ensuing 40th Canadian Parliament Duncan was promoted to the NDP front bench as critic for the environment.  In the Parliament's aborted first session she strongly opposed the government's proposed fiscal update, especially the proposed changes to pay equity claims, four-year wage cap, and suspension of the right to strike for federal employees. She supported the proposed coalition government and condemned the Prime Minister, Stephen Harper, for labeling the coalition government as "treasonous" and "criminal". When Parliament resumed in January 2009, Duncan sat as a member of the House Standing Committee on Environment and Sustainable Development. She supported Ecojustice and the Sierra Club's lawsuit against the government's waiver of federal environmental assessment reviews on infrastructure projects arguing that it required an act of Parliament, rather than the Conservative government's Order in Council. She vocally supported the opposition's Corporate Accountability of Mining, Oil and Gas Corporations in Developing Countries Act that would hold Canadian companies accountable in Canadian courts for human rights and environmental abuses committed in other countries. Duncan introduced three bills into during the second and third sessions: the first proposing that the third Friday of February be declared National Hockey Day, the second establishing an Environmental Bill of Rights, and the third would have amended the Criminal Code to restrict the use of hand-held telecommunications devices while driving. On a private member's bill to abolish the federal gun registry, Linda Duncan was the only MP from Alberta who voted against abolishing the gun registry.

2011 re-election

Duncan was re-elected, with over 50% of the vote in Edmonton—Strathcona, to the 41st Canadian Parliament. She introduced one piece of legislation, a private member bill titled National Literacy Policy Act (Bill C-327) which received first reading on October 5, 2011, but did not advance from there. The bill would have required the government adopt a policy for promoting literacy in Canada and take measures to enact the policy.

In 2014, Linda Duncan introduced an Act to establish a Canadian Environmental Bill of Rights, Bill C-634, "whose provisions apply to all decisions that emanate from a federal source or are related to federal land or a federal work or undertaking".

Duncan spoke at a Jack Layton memorial on August 24, 2012. The event was billed as "Dear Jack" and she was joined by several other prominent figures.

2015 re-election and final term

Duncan was re-elected for a third term in the 2015 federal election. She was appointed the NDP critic for Transport in the 42nd Canadian Parliament.

In August 2018, Duncan announced that she would not seek re-election in the 2019 federal election.

Electoral history

References

External links
Member of Parliament website
2006 campaign profile in the Edmonton Journal
Edmonton-Strathcona NDP riding association

Member of Parliament Profile 

1949 births
Canadian environmental lawyers
Canadian women environmentalists
Canadian women lawyers
Women members of the House of Commons of Canada
Schulich School of Law alumni
Lawyers in Alberta
Living people
Members of the House of Commons of Canada from Alberta
New Democratic Party MPs
Politicians from Edmonton
University of Alberta alumni
Women in Alberta politics
21st-century Canadian politicians
21st-century Canadian women politicians